Hemitrygon longicauda, the Merauke stingray, is a species of stingray in the family Dasyatidae.

Hemitrygon longicauda is found in the Western Pacific, where it is endemic to southern Guinea.

References

Hemitrygon
Taxa named by Peter R. Last
Taxa named by William Toby White
Fish described in 2013